Natasha Louise Baker  (born 30 December 1989) is a British para-equestrian who won 2 gold medals at the 2012 Summer Paralympics, 3 at the 2016 Summer Paralympics, and 1 more in the 2020 Summer Paralympics.

Personal life

Baker was born on 30 December 1989 in Hammersmith, London, England. At the age of 14 months she contracted transverse myelitis, an inflammation in her spine that affected her nerve endings. She was left with weakness and no feeling in her legs.

Equestrianism

Natasha Baker began riding horses as physiotherapists said it would help to strengthen her muscles. She started riding competitively at the age of nine at her local Riding for the Disabled Association in Buckinghamshire. Whilst watching the 2000 Summer Paralympics, at the age of ten, she decided she wanted to compete in the Paralympics. As she lacks strength in her legs she trains her horses to respond to her voice and to movements she can make in the saddle. She competes in the grade III Paralympic classification.

In 2011, she made her first appearance at a senior championships, competing at the European Championships held in Moorsele, Belgium, where she won gold medals in both the individual and freestyle grade II events.

She was selected as part of the dressage squad for Great Britain at the 2012 Summer Paralympics held in London, United Kingdom. In the individual championship test grade II event Baker, riding Cabral, an 11-year-old gelding, scored 76.857% to set a new Paralympic record for the grade II classification and win the gold medal ahead of German defending champion Britta Napel who won silver with a score of 76.000%. She won her second gold medal of the Games in the individual freestyle test grade II. She set a new Paralympic record of 82.800% as she beat second placed Napel by over 5%.

Baker was appointed Member of the Order of the British Empire (MBE) in the 2013 New Year Honours for services to equestrianism and Officer of the Order of the British Empire (OBE) in the 2022 New Years Honours, also for services to equestrianism.

Television Commentating
Baker commentated on Para Dressage at the European Championships 2017 in Gothenburg alongside Rupert Bell. She then went on to commentate on Western European League World Cup Dressage later that year and continue to do so either as colour commentator or solo.

She was also part of the commentary team at the World Equestrian Games 2018 and the European Championships 2019 for Para Dressage and the World Cup Dressage Finals in 2018 & 2019.

See also

 2012 Olympics gold post boxes in the United Kingdom

References

External links 

 
 

1989 births
Living people
English female equestrians
British dressage riders
Paralympic equestrians of Great Britain
Paralympic gold medalists for Great Britain
Paralympic silver medalists for Great Britain
Equestrians at the 2012 Summer Paralympics
Equestrians at the 2016 Summer Paralympics
Equestrians at the 2020 Summer Paralympics
Medalists at the 2012 Summer Paralympics
Medalists at the 2016 Summer Paralympics
Medalists at the 2020 Summer Paralympics
People from Hammersmith
Officers of the Order of the British Empire
Paralympic medalists in equestrian
Television presenters with disabilities